The Chancellor of the University of St Andrews is the titular head of the University of St Andrews. Their duties include conferring degrees, promoting the university's image throughout the world, and furthering the university's interests within and outwith Scotland. The Chancellor does have the power to refuse an "improvement in the internal arrangements of the University", however, there is no evidence of any Chancellor using this effective veto over the University Court.

The Office of the Chancellor has existed since the foundation of the university in the 15th century, and no comprehensive definition of its powers has been made in any modern statute. The remit and powers of the Chancellor were described by Royal Commission on the Universities and Colleges of Scotland, which described the Chancellor of St Andrews thus:

Section 2 of the Universities (Scotland) Act 1858 provides that the Chancellor is to be elected by the General Council, to hold office for life,  although Sir Kenneth Dover retired in 2005. With the exception of Dover, every Chancellor of the university has been either an archbishop or a peer. The Chancellor is the President of the General Council which meets twice each year, in recent years once in St Andrews and once elsewhere in the United Kingdom.
 
The Chancellor appoints an Assessor to be a member of the university's governing body, the University Court.

List of chancellors of the University of St Andrews

1413-1440 Henry Wardlaw, Bishop of St Andrews 
1440-1465 James Kennedy, Bishop of St Andrews 
1465-1478 Patrick Graham, Archbishop of St Andrews 
1478-1497 William Scheves, Archbishop of St Andrews 
1497-1504 James, Duke of Ross, Archbishop of St Andrews 
1504-1513 Alexander Stewart, Archbishop of St Andrews 
1514-1521 Andrew Forman, Archbishop of St Andrews 
1522-1539 James Beaton, Archbishop of St Andrews 
1539-1546 David Beaton, Archbishop of St Andrews 
1547-1571 John Hamilton, Archbishop of St Andrews 
1572-1574 John Douglas, Archbishop of St Andrews 
1576-1592 Patrick Adamson, Archbishop of St Andrews 
1592-1595 John Maitland, 1st Lord Maitland of Thirlestane 
1597-1598 John Lindsay of Balcarres, Lord Menmuir 
1599-1604 John Graham, 3rd Earl of Montrose
1604-1615 George Gledstanes, Archbishop of St Andrews 
1615-1639 John Spottiswoode, Archbishop of St Andrews 
1643-1661 John Campbell, 1st Earl of Loudoun 
1661-1679 James Sharp, Archbishop of St Andrews 
1679-1684 Alexander Burnet, Archbishop of St Andrews 
1684-1689 Arthur Ross, Archbishop of St Andrews 
1697-1724 John Murray, 1st Duke of Atholl 
1724-1744 James Brydges, 1st Duke of Chandos
1746-1765 HRH Prince William Augustus, Duke of Cumberland
1765-1787 Thomas Hay, 9th Earl of Kinnoull 
1788-1811 Henry Dundas, 1st Viscount Melville 
1811-1814 HRH Prince Adolphus Frederick, Duke of Cambridge 
1814-1851 Robert Dundas, 2nd Viscount Melville 
1851-1900 George Douglas Campbell, 8th Duke of Argyll 
1900-1922 Alexander Hugh Bruce, 6th Lord Balfour of Burleigh
1922-1928 Douglas Haig, 1st Earl Haig of Bemersyde 
1928 Richard Burdon Haldane, 1st Viscount Haldane
1929-1947 Stanley Baldwin, 1st Earl Baldwin of Bewdley 
1948-1973 Douglas Douglas-Hamilton, 14th Duke of Hamilton 
1973-1980 Bernard Edward Fergusson, Brigadier The Lord Ballantrae
1981-2005 Sir Kenneth Dover  
2006- Walter Menzies Campbell, The Lord Campbell of Pittenweem

See also
 Governance of the University of St Andrews
 Principal of the University of St Andrews
 Rector of the University of St Andrews

References